Bhimakheda is a village near Mehidpur City, India. It is located in the state of Madhya Pradesh and the district Ujjain.

References

Villages of Ujjain district